Julius Ssekitoleko (born August 7, 2000) is a Ugandan Olympic weightlifter, competing in the 56 kg category and representing  Uganda at international competitions. He has competed at world championships, including at the 2018 Commonwealth Games.

Tokyo Olympics in 2021
After arriving in Japan on June 19, 2021, for the 2020 Tokyo Olympics, Ssekitoleko went missing on July 18, leaving a note behind him explaining his wish to seek a new life. He was later found in Yokkaichi two days later on July 20.

Early life
Ssekitoleko was born August 7, 2000 in Mulago Hospital, Kampala.

See also
Immigration to Japan
List of solved missing person cases

References

External links
Missing Ugandan weightlifter runs away from Olympics to start a new life
Olympics Missing Ugandan weightlifter wanted to stay in Japan - media reports
Ugandan Weightlifter Julius Ssekitoleko Missing in Japan Ahead of Tokyo Olympics
Missing Ugandan Olympic hopeful left note saying he wants to work in Japan
Ugandan athlete escaped from Olympic team in Japan found by police

2000 births
2020s missing person cases
Formerly missing people
Living people
Missing person cases in Japan
People from Kampala
Weightlifters at the 2018 Commonwealth Games
Commonwealth Games competitors for Uganda
Ugandan male weightlifters